Bridgetown is the capital city of Barbados.
 City of Bridgetown (BB Parliament constituency), an electoral constituency for the Barbadian House of Assembly.
 Mayor of Bridgetown, a historical political office of Bridgetown.
 Bridgetown-Grantley Adams Int'l Airport is an airport serving Bridgetown, Barbados (Located in the parish of Christ Church).
 Port of Bridgetown, located in the purpose-built Deep Water Harbour, found along Cheapside, Bridgetown.
 Bridgetown Heliport, a shuttered heliport in Bridgetown on the coast of the Constitution River.

Bridgetown may also refer to:

Australia 
Bridgetown, Western Australia
Shire of Bridgetown-Greenbushes, a Local Government Area in Western Australia

Canada 
Bridgetown, Nova Scotia, a town on the Annapolis River

Ireland 
Bridgetown, County Clare
Bridgetown, County Cork
Bridgetown, County Wexford
Bridgetown Vocational College, County Wexford, Ireland

Saint Vincent and the Grenadines 
Bridgetown, Saint Vincent and the Grenadines, a town in Saint Vincent and the Grenadines

South Africa 
Bridgetown, an area of Athlone, Cape Town

United Kingdom 
Bridgetown, Devon, possibly the original Bridgetown, in England, also considered a part of Totnes
Bridgetown, Somerset, on the north Devon border
Bridgetown, County Tyrone, a townland of County Tyrone, Northern Ireland
Bridgetown, Glasgow, an area of south east Glasgow, in Scotland, also with claims to be the original Bridgetown for several towns founded in ex-British colonies

United States 
Bridgetown, Ohio
Bridgetown, a nickname of Portland, Oregon

See also 
Bridgtown, a village in Staffordshire, England
Bridgeton (disambiguation)